The Poet is the thirteenth studio album by American musician Bobby Womack. The album was released in November 1981, by Beverly Glen Music. The album reached the top of the Billboard Top Black Albums chart due to the success of the single "If You Think You're Lonely Now", which peaked at number three on the Billboard Hot Black Singles chart.

Track listing

Personnel
Bobby Womack - guitar, lead vocals
Nathan East, David Shields - bass
Dorothy Ashby - harp, percussion
David T. Walker - guitar
Eddie "Bongo" Brown, Paulinho da Costa - percussion
James Gadson - drums
Patrick Moten, Dale Ramsey - keyboards
Regina Womack, Sally Womack, Vincent Womack, Tondalei   - handclaps
Cecil Womack, Curtis Womack, Friendly Womack, Jr., The Waters, Richard Griffin, Fernando Harkless, John Parham, Jon Rami  - backing vocals
Technical
Otis Smith - executive producer
Avi Kipper, Barney Perkins, Robert Battaglia - engineer
Greg Fulginiti - mastering engineer
Ginny Livingston - art direction
Norman Seeff - photography

Charts

Singles

References

External links 

The Poet  (Adobe Flash) at Radio3Net (streamed copy where licensed)
 Bobby Womack-The Poet  at Discogs

1981 albums
Bobby Womack albums
Albums produced by Bobby Womack